Arsène Millocheau was a French cyclist of the early 1900s. He was born in Champseru in 1867.

He participated in the 1903 Tour de France, the first Tour, and came last, finishing behind the winner Maurice Garin by 64 hours, 57 minutes and 8 seconds, winning the Lanterne rouge.

In 1921, 54 years old, Millocheau competed in the 1200 km Paris–Brest–Paris.

He died in Paris in 1948.

References

External links

1867 births
1948 deaths
Sportspeople from Eure-et-Loir
French male cyclists
Cyclists from Centre-Val de Loire